Grand Hotel is a musical with a book by Luther Davis, music and lyrics by Robert Wright and George Forrest, and additional music and lyrics by Maury Yeston.

Based on Vicki Baum's 1929 novel, its eponymous spin-off play, Menschen im Hotel (People in a Hotel), and the subsequent 1932 MGM feature film, the musical focuses on events taking place over the course of a weekend in an elegant hotel in 1928 Berlin and the intersecting stories of the eccentric guests of the hotel, including a fading prima ballerina; a fatally ill Jewish bookkeeper, who wants to spend his final days living in luxury; a young, handsome, but destitute Baron; a cynical doctor; an honest businessman gone bad, and a typist dreaming of Hollywood success.

The show's 1989 Broadway production garnered 12 Tony Award nominations, winning five, including best direction and choreography for Tommy Tune.  Big-name cast replacements, including Cyd Charisse and Zina Bethune, helped the show become the first American musical since 1985's Big River to top 1,000 performances on Broadway.

Background
Menschen im Hotel marked the beginning of the career of popular Austrian novelist Baum in 1929 and she dramatized her novel for the Berlin stage later in the same year. After the play became a hit, its English-language adaptation enjoyed success in New York in the early 1930s and was made into the blockbuster 1932 Academy Award-winning film, Grand Hotel, starring Greta Garbo, John Barrymore and Joan Crawford.

At the Grand
Davis, Wright, and Forrest first adapted Baum's story in 1958 under the title At the Grand, changing the setting from 1928 Berlin to contemporary Rome and transforming the ballerina into an opera singer closely resembling Maria Callas to accommodate Joan Diener, who was scheduled to star under the direction of her husband Albert Marre. All of them had collaborated on the earlier musical Kismet and anticipated another success, but Davis' book strayed too far from the story familiar to fans of the film. When Paul Muni agreed to portray Kringelein, the role was changed and expanded, with the character becoming a lowly hotel employee whose stay in a hotel suite is kept secret from the management. Flaemmchen became a dancing soubrette, Preysing and his dramatic storyline were eliminated completely, and two deported American gangsters were added for comic relief.

At the Grand opened to mixed reviews and good business in Los Angeles and San Francisco, but when it became apparent to the creators that Muni was ill and would not be able to sustain a Broadway run, producer Edwin Lester decided to cancel the Broadway opening scheduled for September 25, 1958, and everyone moved on to other projects.

Grand Hotel
Three decades later, Davis, Wright, and Forrest decided to dust off their original material and give the show another try, returning the show to its original setting in 1928 Berlin. This time it was placed in the hands of director-choreographer Tommy Tune, who envisioned it as a two-hour, non-stop production comprising dialogue scenes, musical numbers, and dance routines overlapping and at times competing with each other, thereby capturing the mood of a bustling hotel where something is happening at all times. Seven songs from At the Grand were incorporated into what was now called Grand Hotel, although two were dropped during the Boston tryout.

During the Boston run in 1989, Wright and Forrest acquiesced when Tune requested Maury Yeston, with whom he had worked in Nine, be brought in to contribute fresh material. Yeston wrote seven new songs in the first week, including "Love Can't Happen", "I Want to Go to Hollywood", "At The Grand Hotel", "Bonjour Amour", "Roses at the Station" and "Grand Parade" (the new opening number), as well as additional lyrics for some of the Wright and Forrest songs. At Tune's request, Peter Stone came in as uncredited play doctor, though the book remained entirely the work of Davis. Yeston received billing for Additional Music and Lyrics and was nominated for two Drama Desk Awards for his work.  Ballroom choreography was by Pierre Dulaine and Yvonne Marceau, who played The Gigolo and The Countess in the show, and as a favor to Tune, Thommie Walsh choreographed a brief dance section in "I Want to Go to Hollywood".

Synopsis
The roaring '20s are still in high gear, and Berlin is the center of high life.  Guests come and go at the opulent Grand Hotel, as cynical Doctor Otternschlag, who still suffers from World War I wounds, injects his morphine.  Assistant concierge Erik, busy at the front desk, waits to hear of his son's birth; his wife is having a difficult labor.  Baron Felix Von Gaigern, young, good-looking, and destitute, uses his charisma to help him secure a room in the overbooked hotel while stiffing a tough gangster who pretends to be a chauffeur.  Aging Russian prima ballerina Elizaveta Grushinskaya arrives with her entourage who tries to persuade her that she still can and must dance.  Her confidante and dresser, Raffaela knows that they would have to come up with a lot of money if the dancer failed to show up for her contracted engagements.  Raffaela has feelings for Elizaveta.

Jewish bookkeeper Otto Kringelein, who is fatally ill, wants to spend his life's savings to live his final days at the hotel in the lap of luxury.  The Baron helps him secure a room.  Meanwhile, Hermann Preysing, the general manager of a failing textile mill, hears that the merger with a Boston company is off, spelling financial ruin; he does not want to lie to his stockholders but gives in to the pressure.  He plans to go to Boston to try to revive the merger and presses his temporary secretary, Flaemmchen, to accompany him and "take care of him".  She dreams of Hollywood stardom and fears she might be pregnant, but flirts with the Baron.  She also agrees to a dance, at the Baron's suggestion, with the surprised and delighted Otto.  Elizaveta suffers through another unsuccessful dance performance and rushes back to the hotel.  She bursts into her room to find the Baron as he is about to steal her diamond necklace to pay back the gangster, but he pretends to be her biggest fan.  The two fall in love with each other and spend the night.  He agrees to go with her to Vienna so that she can fulfill her dancing engagements, and they will get married; they plan to meet at the train station.

Two African-American entertainers, the Jimmys, sing at the bar and dance with Flaemmchen.  Erik tries to get off work so that he can join his wife at the hospital, but the unpleasant hotel manager, Rohna, refuses to give him any time off.  The Baron has persuaded Otto to invest in the stock market, and Otto has made a killing in the market overnight.  But Otto is not feeling well, and the Baron helps him to his room, resisting the temptation to steal his wallet.  Otto rewards the Baron with some cash.  The gangster confronts the Baron and directs him to steal Preysing's wallet; he gives the Baron a gun.  Preysing has cornered Flaemmchen in their adjoining rooms and pressures her for sex.  The Baron, who was in Preysing's room trying to steal his wallet, hears Flaemmchen's cries next door and walks into her room to defend her while still holding Preysing's wallet.  After a struggle, Preysing kills the Baron with the gangster's gun.  Preysing is arrested. Raffaela struggles with how to tell Grushinskaya that her lover is dead and ultimately decides not to, leaving Grushinskaya ecstatic to see him at the train station when she leaves.

Otto offers to take Flaemmchen to Paris; he has plenty of money now so that they can enjoy the good life for as much time as he has left, and she realizes that she is fond of him.  Erik has a son and finds out that his wife came through the labor just fine.  Doctor Otternschlag observes: "Grand Hotel, Berlin. Always the same – people come, people go – One life ends while another begins – one heart breaks while another beats faster – one man goes to jail while another goes to Paris – always the same. ... I'll stay – one more day."

Roles and original cast
The Doorman – Charles Mandracchia
Colonel-Doctor Otternschlag - Grievously wounded by gas and shrapnel in WWI; a cynical, ruined man – John Wylie
The Countess - Ballroom Dancer – Yvonne Marceau 
The Gigolo - Ballroom Dancer – Pierre Dulaine
Rohna - Hotel General Manager; a martinet – Rex D. Hays
Erik - Intelligent young assistant concierge, ambitious, about to start a family – Bob Stillman
The Bellboys - Georg Strunk, Kurt Kronenberg, Hans Bittner, Willibald (Captain) – Ken Jennings, Keith Crowningshield, Gerrit de Beer, J. J. Jepson,
The Telephone Operators - Hildegarde Bratts, Sigfriede Holzhiem, Wolffe Bratts – Jennifer Lee Andrews, Suzanne Henderson, Lynnette Perry
The Two Jimmys - Black American Entertainers – David Jackson and Danny Strayhorn
Chauffeur - A gangster posing as a chauffeur – Ben George
Zinnowitz - An attorney in Berlin – Hal Robinson
Sandor - Hungarian Theatre impresario – Mitchell Jason
Witt - Company Manager of Grushinskaya's ballet troupe – Michel Moinot
Madame Peepee - Lavatory Attendant – Kathi Moss
Hermann Preysing - General Director of a large textile mill; a solid burgher – Tim Jerome
Flaemmchen (née Frieda Flamm) - A pretty young typist who has theatrical ambitions – Jane Krakowski
Otto Kringelein - Not old, but mortally ill; a bookkeeper from a small town – Michael Jeter
Baron Felix Von Gaigern - Young, athletic, charming, optimistic, broke – David Carroll
Raffaela - Confidante, Secretary, and sometimes dresser to Elizaveta Grushinskaya – Karen Akers 
Elizaveta Grushinskaya - The still-beautiful, world-famous, about-to-retire Prima Ballerina – Liliane Montevecchi
Scullery Workers: Gunther Gustafsson, Werner Holst, Franz Kohl, Ernst Schmidt – Walter Willison, David Elledge, William Ryall, Henry Grossman
Hotel Courtesan – Suzanne Henderson
Trudie - A Maid – Jennifer Lee Andrews
Detective – William Ryall

Cast

Song list

 "The Grand Parade" - Colonel-Doctor Otternschlag, Company
 "Some Have, Some Have Not" - Scullery Workers, Bellboys
 "As It Should Be" - Baron Felix von Gaigern
 "At the Grand Hotel"/"Table With a View" - Otto Kringelein
 "Maybe My Baby Loves Me" - Two Jimmys, Flaemmchen
 "Fire and Ice" - Elizaveta Grushinskaya, Company
 "Twenty-Two Years"/"Villa on a Hill" - Raffaela
 "I Want to Go to Hollywood" - Flaemmchen
 "Everybody's Doing It" - Zinnowitz
 "As It Should Be" (Reprise) - Baron Felix von Gaigern
 "The Crooked Path" - Hermann Preysing
 "Who Couldn't Dance With You?" - Flaemmchen, Otto Kringelein
 "Merger Is On" - Zinnowitz, Shareholders

 "Gru's Bedroom" - Elizaveta Grushinskaya, Company
 "Love Can't Happen" - Baron Felix von Gaigern, Elizaveta Grushinskaya
 "What You Need" - Raffaela
 "Bonjour Amour" - Elizaveta Grushinskaya
 "H-A-P-P-Y" - Two Jimmys, Company
 "We'll Take a Glass Together" - Baron Felix von Gaigern, Otto Kringelein, Company
 "I Waltz Alone" - Colonel-Doctor Otternschlag
 "H-A-P-P-Y" (Reprise) - Company
 "Roses at the Station" - Baron Felix von Gaigern
 "How Can I Tell Her?" - Raffaela
 "The Grand Parade"/"Some Have, Some Have Not" (Reprise) - Erik, Operators, Company
 "The Grand Waltz" - Company

 Song by Robert Wright and George Forrest
 Song by Maury Yeston

Productions
After thirty-one previews, Grand Hotel opened on November 12, 1989, at the Martin Beck Theatre, and later transferred to the George Gershwin Theatre to complete its total run of 1,017 performances. The show is played without an intermission. The original cast included Liliane Montevecchi as Elizaveta, David Carroll as the Baron, Michael Jeter as Otto, Jane Krakowski as Flaemmchen, Tim Jerome as Preysing, John Wylie as Otternschlag, and Bob Stillman as Erik. Replacements later in the run included Zina Bethune and Cyd Charisse (in her Broadway debut at age 70) as Elizaveta, Rex Smith, Brent Barrett, John Schneider, and Walter Willison as the Baron, and Chip Zien and Austin Pendleton as Kringelein. The production captured 12 Tony nominations, winning five awards, including best direction and choreography for Tommy Tune. The original cast recording was released nearly two years after the show premiered. By the time the recording was made, Carroll was seriously ill with AIDS and died from a pulmonary embolism in the recording studio as he was about to record his vocal tracks. Brent Barrett, his understudy, who had appeared as the Baron in the national tour, sang the role for the cast album, released by RCA Victor. The cast album features a bonus track of Carroll's performance during a 1991 cabaret fundraiser for Equity Fights AIDS, singing the Baron's song, "Love Can't Happen".

The first West End production opened on July 6, 1992, at the Dominion Theatre, where it ran for slightly less than four months. In 2004, Mary Elizabeth Mastrantonio starred as Elizaveta in a small-scale production directed by Michael Grandage at the Donmar Warehouse, garnering an Olivier Award for Best Musical Revival. A further production opened on July 31, 2015, at London's Southwark Playhouse, running for five weeks.

Grand Hotel: The 25th Anniversary Reunion Concert at the nightclub 54 Below in New York City on May 24, 2015, was written and directed by Walter Willison. Willison starred alongside fellow Broadway cast members Montevecchi, Barrett, Jerome, as well as Karen Akers, Ben George, Ken Jennings, Hal Robinson and Chip Zien. Dance consultant was Yvonne Marceau. The show was produced by Encores!, directed by Josh Rhodes, in New York City from March 21–25, 2018. Grand Hotel: A 30th Anniversary Celebration in Concert at the nightclub The Yellow Pavillion (aka The Green Fig), presented by The Green Room 42, in New York City on November 11, 2019, was again written and directed by Willison, as a benefit for the Actors Fund of America, and dedicated to Montevecchi. Willison starred alongside Akers, Jerome, Jennings, Schneider, Jill Powell, Judy Kaye and Sachi Parker. The associate director and choreographer (in the style of Tommy Tune) was Joanna Rush, and dance consultant was again Marceau.

Awards and nominations

Original Broadway production

Original London production

London Revival production

Notes

References
Not Since Carrie: Forty Years of Broadway Musical Flops by Ken Mandelbaum, published by St. Martin's Press (1991), pages 213-216
Grand Hotel at the Music Theatre International website
Information from the StageAgent.com website
2005 Olivier Awards: 
54 Sings Grand Hotel: The 25th Anniversary Reunion Concert by Marilyn Lester 
This Week on Broadway for May 17, 2015: Walter Willison and Grand Hotel, The 25th Anniversary Concert at 54 Below by James Marino

External links
 
 Maury Yeston's Grand Hotel page

1989 musicals
Broadway musicals
Musicals based on films
Musicals based on novels
Musicals based on plays
Laurence Olivier Award-winning musicals
One-act musicals
Compositions by Maury Yeston
Musicals set in the Roaring Twenties
Plays set in Germany
Works set in hotels
Tony Award-winning musicals